Antoni Beszta-Borowski (1880–1943) was a Polish Roman Catholic priest. He was dean of Bielsk Podlaski. He is one of the 108 Martyrs of World War II.

Life 
Antoni Beszta-Borowski was born on September 9, 1880. He was a parish priest and dean of Bielsk Podlaski. He was arrested by the Gestapo on July 15, 1943, and was shot a few hours later. He was declared venerable on March 23, 1999, and was beatified on June 13, 1999. He is venerated on July 15 and June 12.

References

1880 births
1943 deaths
20th-century Polish Roman Catholic priests
People executed by Nazi Germany by firing squad
Polish people executed by Nazi Germany
108 Blessed Polish Martyrs